Viliame Yabaki (born 27 March 1991) is a Fijian cricketer. He played in the 2015 ICC World Cricket League Division Six tournament. In August 2018, he was named in Fiji's squad for Group A of the 2018–19 ICC World Twenty20 East Asia-Pacific Qualifier tournament.

References

External links
 

1991 births
Living people
Fijian cricketers
Place of birth missing (living people)